Michael Schubert (born 31 December 1967) is a retired East German weightlifter. He competed in a heavyweight category at the 1988 Summer Olympics and finished in fourth place. He won two bronze medals at the combined European and world championships in 1989 by lifting 195 kg in the snatch and 230 kg in the clean & jerk.

References

1967 births
Living people
German male weightlifters
Olympic weightlifters of East Germany
Weightlifters at the 1988 Summer Olympics
Sportspeople from Berlin